Pike's Opera House was a theater in Cincinnati owned by distiller and entrepreneur Samuel Napthali Pike (1822–1872). Located on Fourth Street between Vine and Walnut streets, it was the first home of the Cincinnati Symphony Orchestra.

First theater
Pike's Opera House was designed by New York–based architects Horatio Nelson White and John M. Trimble and constructed from 1857 to 1859 at a cost of $500,000. It opened on February 22, 1859. Junius Brutus Booth, Jr. was performing at Pike's for Edward, Prince of Wales, when he was arrested after being informed that his brother, John Wilkes Booth, had assassinated Abraham Lincoln. On March 22, 1866, a gas leak caused the theater to explode, taking with it the original offices of The Cincinnati Enquirer, along with archives of the Enquirers first 25 years. No one was killed.

Second theater
Isaiah Rogers rebuilt the theater after the fire. It reopened on February 12, 1868, the same year that Pike opened another opera house in Manhattan, now known as the Grand Opera House. In 1895, the Cincinnati Symphony Orchestra gave its first concerts at the original Pike's Opera House before moving to Music Hall the following year. Pike's burned down again on February 26, 1903. The ruins remained for two years before the lot was cleared to make way for the Sinton Hotel.

Notes and references

Former music venues in the United States
Former theatres in the United States
1859 establishments in Ohio
Theatres completed in 1859
Music venues completed in 1859
Theatres completed in 1868
Music venues completed in 1868
Buildings and structures demolished in 1866
Buildings and structures demolished in 1903
1866 fires in the United States
1903 fires in the United States
Demolished theatres in the United States
Demolished buildings and structures in Ohio
Music venues in Cincinnati
Theatres in Cincinnati